The Child Support Act is an Act of the New Zealand Parliament that was passed in 1991.

It was passed to reform the legislation around domestic maintenance payments that, at the time, was perceived as being ineffective.

The new legislation enabled custodial parents and caregivers to apply directly to the Inland Revenue Department for assistance in gathering and being paid child support that was owed by a liable parent, rather than needing to hold a Court Hearing.

External links
Child Support Act on New Zealand Legislation

New Zealand
Statutes of New Zealand
1991 in New Zealand law